The 2021 UTSA Roadrunners baseball team represented the University of Texas at San Antonio in the sport of baseball for the 2021 college baseball season. The Roadrunners competed in Division I of the National Collegiate Athletic Association (NCAA) and in Conference USA West Division. They played their home games at Roadrunner Field in San Antonio, Texas. The team was coached by Patrick Hallmark, who was in his second season with the Roadrunners.

Preseason

C-USA media poll
The Conference USA preseason poll was released on February 11, 2021 with the Roadrunners predicted to finish in fifth place in the West Division.

Schedule and results

Schedule Source:
*Rankings are based on the team's current ranking in the D1Baseball poll.

References

External links
•	UTSA Baseball

UTSA
UTSA Roadrunners baseball seasons
UTSA Roadrunners baseball